Ikaw ang Lahat sa Akin (International title: Only You / ) is a 2005 Philippine melodrama romantic soap opera television series directed by FM Reyes and Jerome Chavez Pobocan. The series stars Claudine Barretto, Diether Ocampo, Angelika Dela Cruz, John Lloyd Cruz, Bea Alonzo, and Shaina Magdayao, with an ensemble cast consisting of Geoff Eigenmann, Jaclyn Jose, Tirso Cruz III, Hilda Koronel, Carmi Martin, Nonie Buencamino, Kathleen Hermosa, Rayver Cruz, Vanna Garcia, DM Sevilla, Glaiza de Castro, Kiko Matos, Pia Moran, and Marita Zobel in their supporting roles. The series premiered on ABS-CBN's Primetime Bida evening block, replacing 'Til Death Do Us Part and was replaced by Panday from May 16 to November 4, 2005.

Plot
Nea Cruz Fontanilla (Claudine Barretto) and Jasmin Cruz Fontanilla (Bea Alonzo) are sisters, although they haven’t seen each other since Nea was five years old and Nea’s father Larry (Noni Buencamino) abandoned both her and her mother Elena (Jaclyn Jose) to live with the rich yet cruel Yolanda (Carmi Martin).

Years after their traumatic separation, Nea and Jasmin’s paths cross again. Raised in above-average circumstances by Larry and Yolanda along with her stepsister Hazel (Shaina Magdayao), Jasmin is the resident shy girl in school and the target of pranks by Oliver Ynares (John Lloyd Cruz), the mischievous younger son of the prominent Ynares clan.

As an old-money family, Ynares patriarch Roden (Tirso Cruz III) and matriarch Susana (Hilda Koronel) have given up on the unruly Oliver, setting their hopes instead on the bright, intelligent Ivan (Diether Ocampo) to fulfill their dreams of having a politician in the family. But unknown to Ivan's family - and his beautiful, rich, and devoted girlfriend Karri Medrano (Angelika Dela Cruz) - Ivan has a dark secret that he kept hidden from those he loves, which now threatens to destroy the life he has carefully built.

While Jasmin and Oliver’s imperfect lives are about to take an interesting turn, an unexpected change comes from Nea, who is now dead-set on destroying the life of her estranged father. But what brought about this change in Nea? And how will it affect the Ynares family?

On the same day that Nea's mother dies, Nea is picked by a strange man who drugs and takes advantage of her. She later finds out it was Ivan Ynares. Jasmin and Oliver break up due to Nea's rape allegations and also because Oliver thinks Jasmin was cheating on him with her childhood friend.

Nea goes to court, but before it starts she is bombed by Roden's men. Susana leaves the house and breaks up with Roden when she finds out Roden was cheating on her with Yolanda. In response, Roden vowed to take his revenge on the Fontenellier family.

Cast and characters

Main
 Claudine Barretto as Nea Cruz-Fontanilla
 Diether Ocampo as Ivan Ynares
 Angelika Dela Cruz as Karri Medrano-Ynares
 John Lloyd Cruz as Oliver Ynares
 Bea Alonzo as Jasmin Cruz-Fontanilla
 Shaina Magdayao as Hazel Gerochi-Fontanilla

Supporting
 Geoff Eigenmann as Ricardo 'Third' Fernando III
 Jaclyn Jose as Elena Cruz
 Tirso Cruz III as Roden Ynares
 Hilda Koronel as Susana Ynares
 Carmi Martin as Yolanda Gerochi-Fontanilla
 Nonie Buencamino as Larry Fontanilla
 Kathleen Hermosa as Vonnie
 Rayver Cruz as Nat
 Vanna Garcia as Daphne
 DM Sevilla
 Glaiza de Castro as Magnolia Cortez
 Kiko Matos
 Raphael Martinez
 Pia Moran
 Marita Zobel

Theme song
The theme song is also called Ikaw Ang Lahat Sa Akin and it is sung by Ella May Saison, originally sung by Martin Nievera and also covered by Regine Velasquez.

Trivia
Diether Ocampo joined this primetime drama series after 'Til Death Do Us Part ended on May 13. Ocampo was reunited with Angelika Dela Cruz in the series having previously worked together in Sana'y Wala Nang Wakas. Former 'Til Death Do Us Part and Sana'y Wala Nang Wakas lead, Kristine Hermosa, went on to be paired with actor TJ Trinidad for the revival drama series Gulong ng Palad (production began in July that year and it was not finished until January 9, 2006, past the date of the series' premiere). On the other hand, former Sana'y Wala Nang Wakas lead Jericho Rosales went on to star in the reboot of the FPJ-starrer Panday opposite Heart Evangelista.
Ocampo is also reunited with Claudine Barretto, having worked together in two successful prior primetime drama series in the late 1990s, Mula sa Puso and Saan Ka Man Naroroon.
Shaina Magdayao, John Lloyd Cruz and Bea Alonzo were also reunited after working together in Kay Tagal Kang Hinintay.
Angelika Dela Cruz also joined the cast of Bituing Walang Ningning the following year, where she played Lavinia as the anti-heroine role to Dorina (Sarah Geronimo) and in 2007, she played Maningning's (Kristine Hermosa) ambitious twin sister in Prinsesa ng Banyera.

International broadcast
It aired in Vietnam on TodayTV - VTC7 from March 26, 2010, under the title Chỉ một mình em.

See also
 List of programs broadcast by ABS-CBN
 List of ABS-CBN drama series

References

External links

2005 Philippine television series debuts
2005 Philippine television series endings
Philippine melodrama television series
ABS-CBN drama series
Television series by Star Creatives
Filipino-language television shows
Television shows set in the Philippines